Gordonsburg is an unincorporated community in northeastern Lewis County, Tennessee. It lies at the intersection of U.S. Route 412 with the Natchez Trace Parkway, east of the city of Hohenwald, the county seat of Lewis County. Its elevation is 610 feet (186 m).

References

Unincorporated communities in Lewis County, Tennessee
Unincorporated communities in Tennessee